Negros Occidental, officially the Province of Negros Occidental, is a province in the Philippines located in the Western Visayas region. Its capital is the city of Bacolod, of which it is geographically situated and grouped under by the Philippine Statistics Authority, but remains politically independent from the provincial government. It occupies the northwestern half of the large island of Negros, and borders Negros Oriental, which comprises the southeastern half. Known as the "Sugarbowl of the Philippines", Negros Occidental produces more than half the nation's sugar output.

Negros Occidental faces the island-province of Guimaras and the province of Iloilo on Panay Island to the northwest across the Panay Gulf and the Guimaras Strait. The primary spoken language is Hiligaynon and the predominant religious denomination is Roman Catholicism. Bacolod is the capital, seat of government and the most populous city of the province, but is governed independently as a highly urbanized city. With a population of 2,623,172 inhabitants, it is the most populated province in Western Visayas, the second most-populous province in the Visayas after Cebu and the 8th most-populous province of the Philippines. The province also has the most chartered cities among all the provinces in the Philippines with a total of 12, excluding Bacolod.

History

Negros was originally known to the natives as "Buglas", meaning "cut off" in old Hiligaynon. When the Spaniards arrived in April 1565, they named it "Negros" because of the dark-skinned natives they found. Two of the earliest native settlements were Binalbagan and Ilog which later became towns in 1572 and 1584, respectively. Other settlements were Hinigaran, Bago, Marayo (now Pontevedra), Mamalan (now Himamaylan) and Candaguit (now a sitio of San Enrique).

Ilog was made the first capital of the province in 1743. This was later transferred to Himamaylan. Bacolod finally became the capital in 1849. The island was divided into Negros Occidental and Negros Oriental in 1890. The two provinces were briefly unified as the independent Cantonal Republic of Negros, with Bacolod as the capital on November 27, 1898. It became a protectorate of the United States until 1901, when the republic was dissolved, with the two provinces annexed back to the Philippines.

During the succeeding decades between 1901 and the 1930s, Negros Occidental and Negros Oriental were both under Insular Government of the United States of America as with the rest of the nation and later under the Government of the Commonwealth of the Philippines. Economic growth continued especially with Philippine sugar having a part of the US market. The socio-economic lives of the island of Negros, from the 1950s up to the late 1980s, depended as before, mainly on the sugar industry.

From 1914 to 1927, parts of Western Negros hosted several newly established settlements which became cities connected by railroads constructed to flow towards several "sugar centrals" which were processing the extremely sweet raw sugar canes grown in Negros' volcanic soil and farmed by several "Haciendas". These haciendas littered the countryside as the central sugar mills eventually grew to become full pledged towns and cities: chief among which were Ilog, Hinigaran, La Carlota, Silay, Pulupandan, Bacolod, San Carlos and Bais Western Negros also saw massive immigration from Panay as the Spanish, Chinese, and French mestizos who administered the Haciendas imported laborers from Panay island to foster the farming of Negros' sugar plantations and thereby displacing the Cebuano speaking natives.

During World War II, both Negros provinces were invaded by Imperial Japanese forces, resorting many residents to flee to the inland mountains. Negros Island was liberated by combined Philippine & American troops with the local Negrense guerillas attacking the Japanese on August 6, 1945. The 7th, 73rd, 74th and 75th Infantry Divisions of the Philippine Commonwealth Army were established from January 3, 1942, to June 30, 1946, and the 7th Constabulary Regiment of the Philippine Constabulary was active from October 28, 1944, to June 30, 1946, at the Military General Headquarters in Negros Occidental. They started the engagements of the Anti-Japanese Imperial Military Operations in Negros from 1942 to 1945 against the Japanese Imperial forces.

Global sugar prices dropped during the 1970s and 1980s, which negatively impacted the production of sugar in the island. Quality of life and sugar production were intertwined, so lower production meant lower quality of life for thousands that relied on the industry for sustenance and financial stability. The province saw a dangerous spike in the percentage of malnourished infants which was as high as 78%. Negros Occidental's problem on malnourished infants gained global prominence among the press in 1985, as they ran covers on both, local and international newspapers. During the 1970s and 1980s, atrocities against peasants were committed, with one such harrowing example being the Escalante Massacre.
The Province has a history of problems with mine pollution, one of the worst episodes being the tailings dam failure and spill of 28 million tonnes of copper mine tailings from a mine of the Maricalum company on November 8, 1982

Negros del Norte was created from Negros Occidental on January 3, 1986, but its creation was declared unconstitutional on July 11, 1986, and was immediately abolished on August 18, 1986.

Post EDSA Revolution

Towards the end of 1987, after the successful overthrow of the Marcos regime, the overall economic situation started to show a positive upturn. The campaign for agricultural diversification had been gaining momentum, paving the way for more landowners to invest in prawn and fish farming, seafood catching, raising of livestock and high-value organic produce such as fruits and vegetables, as well as other cash crops. Investments' upswing became apparent by 1988. The participation of the industrial sector accelerated the consumer-led economic growth and development manifested with the increase in sales of consumer goods and by-products. Today, Negros Occidental remains one of the most progressive and largely developed Philippine provinces, in large due to the profits from the sugar industry, but also due to economic diversification in other fields. Due to the vast population of Negros Occidental, it became the province with the most number of cities outside of the National Capital Region.

On May 29, 2015, the Negros Island Region was formed when Negros Occidental and its capital was separated from Western Visayas and transferred to the new region along with Negros Oriental, when President Benigno Aquino III signed Executive Order No. 183, s. 2015. But it was abolished on August 9, 2017, when President Rodrigo Duterte revoked Executive Order No. 183, s. 2015 through the signage of Executive Order No. 38, citing the reason of the lack of funds to fully establish the NIR according to Benjamin Diokno, the Secretary of Budget and Management, reverting Negros Occidental and its capital back into Western Visayas. However, with the Philippines' current presidential administration promoting federalism, the idea of the twin provinces of Negros Occidental and Negros Oriental reunified into one federal state/region is already in the talks of local provincial politicians, with additional support from the native Negrenses.  There is also a suggestion, jointly approved by the provincial governors, that Negros Occidental along with Negros Oriental, be renamed with their pre-colonial names as "Buglas Nakatundan" and "Buglas Sidlakan" respectively, with Negros, as a federal state, be named as "Negrosanon Federated Region", due to the negative racial connotation associated with the name "Negros".

Geography

It is bounded by the Visayan Sea in the north, Panay Gulf on the west, Negros Oriental province and Tañon Strait on the east and Sulu Sea on the south. Negros is basically volcanic, making its soil ideal for agriculture. Eighty percent of all arable land in the island region is cultivated.

The north and western parts of the province are largely composed of plains and gentle slopes. A mountain range lines the eastern part of the province, forming the basis of the border with Negros Oriental.

Administrative divisions
Negros Occidental comprises 19 municipalities and 13 cities, further subdivided into 662 barangays. It has the most chartered cities among all the provinces in the Philippines excepting the Capital. Although Bacolod serves as the capital, it is governed independently from the province as a highly urbanized city.

Demographics

Residents of Negros are called "Negrenses" (and less often "Negrosanons") and many are of either pure or mixed Austronesian heritage, with foreign ancestry (i.e. Chinese and/or Spanish) as minorities. Negros Occidental is predominantly a Hiligaynon-speaking province with 84% of residents speaking it as a first language, because of its linguistic ties with Iloilo. Cebuano is spoken by the remaining 16%, especially in the cities and towns facing the Tañon Strait, due to their proximity to the island-province of Cebu. A mixture of Hiligaynon and Cebuano is spoken in Sagay and surrounding places, which both face Iloilo and Cebu. Filipino and English are widely spoken and used on both sides of the island for educational, literary and official purposes.

Negros Occidental is the second most-populous province in the Visayas after Cebu, having the second largest number of congressional districts and the 7th most-populous (4th if highly urbanized cities and independent component cities are included in the population of corresponding provinces) in the Philippines based on the 2015 Census. As of 2010, the population of registered voters are 1,478,260.

Religion
Catholicism is the predominant religion, with over 2 million adherents. Negros Occidental falls under the jurisdictions of the Roman Catholic Dioceses of Bacolod, San Carlos & Kabankalan. Other major Christian denominations include Baptist churches, Aglipayan Church, Iglesia ni Cristo, Seventh-day Adventist Church, and Evangelicalism. Islam is practised by a minority, with 1,842 claiming it as their religion.

Economy

Known as the "Sugarbowl of the Philippines", the sugar industry is the lifeblood of the economy of Negros Occidental, producing more than half of the country's sugar. There are 15 sugar centrals located throughout the lowland areas the north and west of the island, stretching from northwest along the coasts of the Visayan Sea and Guimaras Strait. Among the larger mills are in San Carlos, La Carlota, Bago, Binalbagan, Kabankalan, Sagay, Silay, Murcia and Victorias. Victorias Mill in Victorias City is the largest sugar mill in the country, and the world's largest integrated sugar mill and refinery. Sugar is transported from plantations to refineries by large trucks that use the national highway.

A fishing industry is found in Cadiz, and other fishponds that dot the province. One of the country's largest copper mines is located in Sipalay City. There also exists a cottage industry which produced handicrafts made from indigenous materials.

The province is rich in mineral deposits. Minerals that abound in the province are primary copper with estimated reserve of 591 million metric tons and gold ore with estimated reserve of 25 million tons. Silver and molybdenum deposits are also abundant, as well as non-metallic minerals suitable for agricultural and industrial uses. Notwithstanding its great potential, the mining industry in Negros Occidental has remained virtually dormant since the biggest copper mine in Sipalay suspended its operation in 2000.

Bacolod is the center of commerce and finance in Negros Occidental. It has oil companies, factories, bottling plants, allied industrial businesses, steel fabrication, power generation, agri-businesses, prawn culture and other aqua-culture ventures.

It is also the Business Process Outsourcing (BPO) hub of the Negros Island Region of the Philippines. Bacolod has an estimated 35,000 workforce in the IT-BPO industry working in 20 major companies. Among the notable BPO companies operating in the city are Convergys, Teleperformance, TTEC, Focus Direct International, Inc. – Bacolod, Panasiatic Solutions, Ubiquity Global Services, Transcom Asia and iQor. As of 2019, Negros Occidental has a total of 13 operating PEZA-registered IT Parks and Centers.

In 2012, a two-hectare portion of the four-hectare Paglaum Sports Complex was partitioned for the construction of the provincial government-owned Negros First CyberCentre (NFCC) as an IT-BPO Outsourcing Hub with a budget of P674-million. It is located at Lacson corner Hernaez Streets in Bacolod and offers up to 22,000 square meters of mixed IT-BPO and commercial spaces. Its facilities are divided into three sections — Information Technology, Commercial Support Facilities, and Common IT Facilities. It was inaugurated in April 2015 in rites led by President Benigno S. Aquino III. The area was initially a residential zone and has been reclassified as a commercial zone as approved by the Comprehensive Zoning Ordinance.

By 2014, Negros Occidental is the province with the highest income in all of the Philippines, earning an average of P3.332 billion.

Food and agriculture
There are 12 sugar mills in the province, of which only 10 are presently operational. Victorias Milling Company has the highest rated capacity with 15,000 tonnes cane per day.

However, the volatility of the sugar industry forced the province to shift, albeit slowly, to other high-value crops and alternative industries. The diversification has proven to be highly successful. Production of rice, the basic commodity for food security, has been increasing. By 2003, annual output of 437 thousand metric tons of palay was 33% better than two years ago. This allowed the province to significantly raise its sufficiency level from 65% to more than 84%. The improvement could be attributed to the introduction and promotion of hybrid rice, which increased rice yields to 3.8 metric tons per hectare. Because of the success of the program, area planted to hybrid rice has increased nearly fivefold. The highest hybrid yield was recorded at 10.3 tons per hectare.

Corn also registered increasing gains. Production for 2003 of 42 thousand metric tons outperformed 2001 output by 18%. Average yield per hectare has also grown by 18%. Other fruit and vegetable crops, except for banana and cassava, likewise improved their harvest. Harvested coconut was placed at 139 million nuts, while production of banana; fruit and vegetable crops totaled 110 million kilograms. Livestock and poultry are industries where Negros Occidental has strongly diversified.

With the province successfully quarantined from the foot and mouth disease and bird flu, as well as with other endemic diseases under control, total production of livestock and poultry in 2003 of 49 thousand metric tons exceeded estimated local demand by 18%. Fishing is likewise an industry where the province has remained focused. After all, 9 of its cities and 16 of its municipalities are located along the coastline and a great portion of the population depends on fishing for their livelihood.

The area for exploitation by this industry is huge, covering most of the coastal areas and the rich fishing grounds of the Visayan Sea on the north, Sulu Sea on the south, Tañon Strait on the east and Guimaras Strait and Panay Gulf at the west. These rich coastal areas and fishing grounds continue to be generous to the people of Negros Occidental. In 2003, products from deep-sea fishing, municipal marine and inland waters, and aquaculture reached 87 thousand metric tons, 30% better than 2001 production.

Government

Congressional districts:

1st District:
 City: Escalante, San Carlos
 Municipality: Calatrava, Toboso, Salvador Benedicto
 Congressman: Gerardo Valmayor Jr.

2nd District:
 City: Cadiz, Sagay
 Municipality: Manapla
 Congressman: Alfredo Marañon III

3rd District:
 City: Silay, Talisay, Victorias
 Municipality: Enrique B. Magalona, Murcia
 Congressman: Kiko Benitez

4th District:
 City: Bago, La Carlota
 Municipality: Pontevedra, Pulupandan, San Enrique, Valladolid
 Congressman: Juliet Marie Ferrer

5th District:
 City: Himamaylan
 Municipality: Binalbagan, Hinigaran, Isabela, La Castellana, Moises Padilla
 Congressman: Dino Yulo

6th District:
 City: Kabankalan, Sipalay
 Municipality: Candoni, Cauayan, Hinoba-an, Ilog
 Congressman: Mercedes Alvarez

Lone District of Bacolod:
Congressman: Greg Gasataya

Culture and arts

Negros Occidental has long been a center of culture and arts; the wealth brought about by the sugar industry made sure that the Negrense principalía enjoyed an above-average standard of living.

Silay City, to the north of the capital of Bacolod, nicknamed the "Paris of Negros", is the cultural and artistic center of Negros Island Region. It has 30 heritage houses declared by the national historical institute, most notable of which is Balay Negrense; it is also the hometown of National Artist of the Philippines for Architecture Leandro Locsin and international mezzo-soprano Conchita Gaston.

This blossoming in art was due to the economical importance of the area during the Spanish era, Negros became probably the most hispanized and pro-Spanish area, due to the enormous investments of Spain in the sugar business.

Another famous treasure of Negrense art heritage can be found in Victorias City, within the confines of the Victorias Milling Company in its chapel is the world-famous mural of the Angry Christ, painted by artist Alfonso Ossorio, a scion of the Ossorio family who owned the mill.

The Negrenses' joie de vivre is manifest in the various festivals all over the province, foremost being the famous MassKara Festival of Bacolod, Pasalamat Festival of La Carlota, Bailes de Luces of La Castellana and Pintaflores Festival of San Carlos. These and other local festivals are featured during the Pana-ad sa Negros Festival staged every April at the  tree-lined Panaad Stadium in Bacolod. Dubbed as the "Festival of Festivals", Pana-ad brings together the 13 cities and 19 towns in a showcase of history, arts and culture, tourism, trade, commerce and industry, beauty and talent as well as games and sports.

Negros Occidental is rich in structures and buildings that are remnants of a once affluent lifestyle. The Palacio Episcopal (1930), San Sebastian Cathedral (1876), and the Capitol Building (1931) are popular landmarks. In most towns, steam locomotives that used to cart sugarcane from the fields to refineries attract steam-engine enthusiasts from all over the world. There are also impressive churches all over the province, both built recently and during the Spanish era.

Festivals

Panaad sa Negros Festival

The Panaad sa Negros Festival, also called simply as the Panaad Festival (sometimes spelled as Pana-ad), is a festival held annually during the month of April in Bacolod, the capital of Negros Occidental province in the Philippines. Panaad is the Hiligaynon word for "vow" or "promise"; the festival is a form of thanksgiving to Divine Providence and commemoration of a vow in exchange for a good life. The celebration is held at the Panaad Park, which also houses the Panaad Stadium, and is participated in by the 13 cities and 19 towns of the province. For this reason, the province dubs it the "mother" of all its festivals.

The first Panaad sa Negros Festival was held at Capitol Park and Lagoon in a three-day affair in 1993 that started April 30. The festival was held at the lagoon fronting the Provincial Capitol for the first four years. As the festival grew each year, it became necessary to locate a more spacious venue. In 1997, the festival was held at the reclaimed area near where the Bredco Port is located today. The construction of the Panaad Stadium and sports complex paved the way for the establishment of the Panaad Park as the permanent home of the festival.

Negros Island Organic Farmers Festival
Negros Island is considered as the Organic Capital of the Philippines since it hosts the longest running organic festival in the Philippines. On August 4, 2005, the provinces of Negros Occidental and Negros Oriental signed a Memorandum of Agreement to promote Sustainable Agriculture and Rural Development in the Island. Starting 2006, a Negros Island Organic Farmers Festival is held to showcase products of Negros Island and to promote organic agriculture.

Sports
Negros Occidental has produced a large number of athletes that have achieved success in both national and international circuits. The province is also well known for hosting national and international athletic events, which has given it a reputation as the sports capital of the Philippines.

Football
Negros Occidental has a long, entrenched history when it comes to football. The first ever Filipino to play in the European football circuit was Bacolod-born Manuel Amechazurra, who joined FC Barcelona from 1905 to 1915.

The Panaad Stadium in Bacolod has been a venue for national and international athletic events; such as the 23rd Southeast Asian Games men's football and the 2006 ASEAN football qualifiers. On February 9, 2011, the stadium hosted a match between the Philippines national football team and Mongolia in the 2012 AFC Challenge Cup qualification with an attendance of 20,000 people.

Bacolod has been christened as a Philippine "football city" for its patronage of the sport in the country. A few members of the Philippine football team are from Negros: most notable is goalkeeper Eduard Sacapaño, a native of Bago; Tating Pasilan and Jinggoy Valmayor of San Carlos City; and ace striker Joshua Beloya of Bacolod.

Negros Occidental has its own football association: Negros Occidental F.A. It works under the Philippine Football Federation as provincial football association for the Negros Occidental area. The Negros Occidental FA sends a team to represent the region in the yearly PFF National Men's Open Championship and PFF National Women's Open Championship. In the 2011 season of the PFF Suzuki Cup U-23 National Championship, the Negros team were crowned as champions where they defeated their fierce football rival Iloilo (IFA) in the finals.

Negros Occidental is also home of the 2013 PFF National Men's Club Champions, 2017 Philippines Football League Champions, Ceres-Negros, who represented the province in the said tournament. They battled UFL Cup Champions Stallion in the Round of 16 and won 1–0. They battled 2012 UFL Champions Global in the quarterfinals and also won 1–0. In the semifinals, Ceres FC topped Kaya with 3–1 scoreline to enter finals of 2013 PFF National Men's Club Championship. Ceres FC eventually won the 2013 PFF National Men's Club Championship trophy after they beat the other finalist PSG with 1–0 score.

Ceres-Negros FC is the Philippines Football League Champions in 2017 and 2018.

Boxing
Aside from hosting sporting events Negros Occidental has produced many of the nation's finest athletes, particularly in boxing. The likes of 1923 World Flyweight boxing champion, Francisco Guilledo a.k.a. Pancho Villa, current WBO minimum weight champion Donnie Nietes, 1970's WBA world junior lightweight champion Ben Villaflor, all hail from Negros Occidental.

It is also notable for producing Olympiads, Silver Medalist Mansueto Velasco in the 1996 Summer Olympics, his brother Roel Velasco who in turn won a bronze medal in the 1992 Summer Olympics.

Golf
Bacolod has two major golf courses. These are the Bacolod Golf and Country Club and the Negros Occidental Golf and Country Club. The city hosted the 61st Philippine Airlines Inter-club Golf Tournament and the 2008 Philippine Amateur Golf Championship.

Karatedo
Bacolod hosted two major karatedo championships, the 1996 Philippine Karatedo Federation National Championship and the 2007 20th PKF National Open. Both tournaments were held at the La Salle Coliseum of USLS. The tournaments were contested by hundreds of karatedo practitioners all over the country.

Basketball
Bacolod hosted the 2008 PBA All-Star Weekend. The city is also a regular venue for the Philippine Basketball Association out-of-town games. Another major sports team in the past is the Negros Slashers, arguably the most successful team of the now defunct Metropolitan Basketball Association

Mixed Martial Arts
Bacolod and its neighboring cities and towns are home to many mixed martial arts competitions including quarterly fights hosted by the Universal Reality Combat Championship (URCC).

Ceres-Negros F.C.
  

Ceres–Negros F.C., commonly referred to as Ceres–Negros or just Ceres, is a Filipino football club based in the city of Bacolod, Negros Occidental that plays in the Philippines Football League. The club is a member of the Negros Occidental Football Association. It was previously known as the Ceres–La Salle Football Club.

2018 - PFL Champion;
2017 - PFL Champion;
2017 - AFC Cup ASEAN Zone Champion;
2015 - UFL Division 1 Champion;
2014 - UFL FA League Cup Champion;
2014 - UFL Division 2 Champion;
2014 - PFF National Men's Club Champion;
2013 - PFF National Men's Club Champion;
2012 - Negros Men's Open Football Champion;

Infrastructure
Through its capital, Bacolod, Negros Occidental is only 50 minutes from Manila and 30 minutes from Cebu by air. By sea, it is an 18-hour cruise from Manila and an hour by fast ferries from Iloilo. It is also accessible by sea and land trip from Cebu via Escalante, San Carlos City and Dumaguete in Negros Oriental. Travel from Bacolod to Dumaguete is only 5 to 6 hours by land. Seven airline companies, including Philippine Airlines, Cebu Pacific and Air Philippines, serve the province. Four inter-island shipping lines call on nine seaports of Negros Occidental

Bacolod–Silay Airport

On January 18, 2008, the new airport was inaugurated in Silay City, 16 kilometers north of Bacolod. The new airport replaced the old Bacolod City Domestic Airport. The new airport runway is of international standards and was constructed to facilitate future landings of international flights to serve the growing number of tourists visiting Negros Occidental each year.

Kabankalan City Domestic Airport

A new airport designed to serve the general area of Kabankalan City. The airport would be the second airport in Negros Occidental, after the Bacolod-Silay International Airport and the third airport on Negros Island Region. It is located four kilometers northeast of Kabankalan City proper on a  site in Barangay Hilamonan. Completion of the airport is still undergoing.

Sipalay Airport

On August 3, 2017, Air Juan started to open flights to Sipalay City from Cebu and Iloilo. Flights from Cebu to Sipalay will be every Wednesday while Sipalay to Cebu on Sundays; Iloilo to Sipalay on Mondays and return on Thursdays. Sipalay Mayor Oscar C. Montilla, Jr. had been looking forward to having an airline company operate in the city to boost tourism. The small Sipalay airport with a 1,400-meter runway is located in a  property of the local government. Negros Occidental Governor Alfredo G. Marañon, Jr. has committed to support the planned concreting of the runway.

Road network and accommodations
All cities and municipalities are linked by an extensive road and bridge network stretching more than 1,500 kilometers crisscrossing the province with seven alternative scenic routes to the nearby province of Negros Oriental. Within the province, travel is also easy, comfortable and even enjoyable with air-conditioned and non-aircon buses or metered taxis. Car rental services are also available. However, the jeepney is still the most common means of transport among the towns and cities. For accommodations, visitors may choose from a wide range of about 67 hotels, pension and lodging houses and tourist inns. The better known hotels are L’ Fisher, Bacolod Convention Plaza (Luxur Place), Pagcor Hotel, Business Inn, Metro Inn, Planta Centro Bacolod Hotel and Residences, and Sugarland Hotel, all in Bacolod.

Energy and water
The province has adequate power and water supplies. It is currently interconnected to the Visayas Power Grid whose main sources of power are geothermal. Aside from its existing 170 megawatts capacity, Negros Island by 2006 has an additional 105 megawatts of locally produced power from geothermal plants in Bago and in barangay Palinpinon, Valencia, Negros Oriental, and from bagasse co-generation facility of First Farmers Sugar Mill. Ample water supply for household, commercial, industrial and agricultural uses is assured by 73 thousand hectares of proclaimed and protected major watersheds, regular rainfall and six major river systems.

San Carlos City is going to play a major role in renewable energy as it will be the site of San Carlos Solar Energy INC. It is a solar farm with an initial capacity of 13 MW in Phase 1, and a provision for an addition of 7 MW in Phase 2. It is intended to provide power to the grid throughout the year, at pre-determined Feed-In-Tariff rates set by the ERC. It is a DOE approved stand-alone solar power plant consisting of approximately 52,000 modules.

Communications and medical facilities

International direct dialing, fiber optic data lines and internet services are accessible in most areas of the province. Also, GSM, digital and analog cellular networks provide good coverage in Bacolod and other areas, including international roaming. The medical and health care needs of the people of Negros Occidental and its guests are presently being met by 20 government hospitals (which include the Corazon Locsin Montelibano Memorial Regional Hospital in Bacolod and the Teresita Lopez Jalandoni Provincial Hospital in Silay) and 10 private hospitals, as well as several city and municipal health centers, barangay health stations and day-care centers.

Banking, finance and accessibility
Banking and finance is likewise a thriving industry in Negros Occidental. According to the latest count, there are 389 financial institutions competing for businesses in the province. 149 of these are banks. Negros Occidental offers several advantages for those who are doing business in the province. It is strategically located near Metro Manila, Metro Cebu and Metro Davao, all major international gateways with maximum travel time of only about 4 hours between the Philippines and its neighbors in Southeast Asia. It is equipped with major infrastructure facilities for easy travel and shipment of goods within and outside of Negros.

It has information and communication facilities with connection capabilities necessary for, among others, call center operations for business communication and transmission of data. The province has abundant water supply and dependable power supply. Modern health care facilities with medical services are available, as well as academic institutions.

Landmarks

Panaad Park and Sports Complex

The Panaad Park and Sports Complex houses the Panaad Stadium which is a multi-purpose stadium in the province. It is currently used mostly for football matches, and was used for the 2005 South East Asian Games. It was the venue of the pre-qualifiers of the 2007 ASEAN Football Championship or ASEAN Cup, in which the Philippines, Cambodia, Timor Leste, Brunei and Laos participated. The stadium has a seating capacity of 15,500, but holds around 20,000 people with standing areas. It is unofficially designated as the home stadium of the Philippines national football team. Aside from the association football field, it also has a rubberized track oval, an Olympic-size swimming pool and other sports facilities.

The stadium is also the home of Panaad sa Negros Festival, a week-long celebration participated in by all cities and municipalities in the province held annually every summer. The festival is highlighted by merry-making and field demonstrations at the stadium. The stadium itself features replicas of the landmarks of the 13 cities and municipalities of Negros Occidental.

Capitol Park and Lagoon

The Capitol Park and Lagoon is a provincial park located right in the heart of Bacolod, Negros Occidental, in the Philippines. One of the landmarks of the park is the statue of a carabao (water buffalo) being pulled by a woman. This statue is located at the northern end of the lagoon. On the other end, there is also another carabao sculpture but the figure is being pulled by a man.

Local everyday activities in the park include jogging, aerobics, school dance rehearsals, promenaders, arnisadors, and martial arts practitioners.

Fountain of Justice

The Fountain of Justice is a historic landmark in Bacolod, Negros Occidental, Philippines. It marks the location where the house of Jose Ruiz de Luzurriaga used to stand. It was in this house that the surrender of Bacolod by Spanish authorities to the Filipino forces of General Aniceto Lacson took place on November 6, 1898, during the Negros Revolution.

Bacolod Public Plaza

The Bacolod Public Plaza is one of the notable landmarks of Bacolod, the capital of Negros Occidental, Philippines. It is located in the heart of the downtown area, near the city hall and across from the San Sebastian Cathedral. The plaza is a trapezoidal park with a belt of trees around the periphery and a gazebo at the center. Scattered within the trees are four circular fountains.

The plaza was constructed in 1927 as a place for recreation, political, spiritual and cultural activities. It is quite a popular site for outdoor picnics and concerts. The gazebo is often used to house a bandstand.

Balay Negrense

The Balay Negrense was originally the ancestral house of Victor F. Gaston, a son of Yves Leopold Germain Gaston and Prudencia Fernandez. The elder Gaston is credited as one of the pioneers of sugarcane cultivation in this portion of the Philippine archipelago. A native of Normandy in France, he married a Filipina from Batangas where he initially began experimenting with sugar production before relocating to Negros.

Built in 1897, the structure housed Victor Gaston and his twelve children from 1901 until his death in 1927. Left unused by the family, the structure was abandoned in the mid-1970s and fell into disrepair until a group of concerned Negrenses formed what would later become the Negros Cultural Foundation and managed to acquire the house from the heirs of Gaston through a donation. With donations from prominent individuals and later the Department of Tourism, the structure was repaired and furnished with period furniture and fixtures. The museum was officially inaugurated on October 6, 1990.

Mariano Ramos Ancestral House

The Mariano Ramos Ancestral House is the home of the late Don Mariano V. Ramos, the son of Agaton Ramos and Dolores Varela, was the first appointed Presidente Municipal of Bacolod, Philippines. It was built in the 1930s and its architecture is a combination of Castilian and Tuscan and has three storeys, including the tower room, known as the torre.

During World War II, Don Mariano's Ancestral house was the most prominent structure with a view over the whole city. The commanding Japanese general was disguised as a family gardener. As the war broke, the Japanese seized the Mariano Ramos Ancestral house in order to use it as a watchtower and as a headquarters.

San Diego Pro-cathedral

The San Diego Pro-cathedral, formerly known as the San Diego Parish Church or the St. Didacus Parish Church before its declaration as a pro-cathedral in 1994, is an early 20th-century church in Silay City, Negros Occidental in the Philippines. It is the only pro-cathedral outside of the national capital of Manila, and is unique in Negros Occidental for being the only church in the province featuring a cupola or dome.

The Ruins

The mansion dates back to the 1900s when it was built by sugar baron Don Mariano Ledesma Lacson for his first wife, Maria Braga, a Portuguese from Macau whom he met in his vacations in Hong Kong. The mansion's structure is of Italianate architecture enhanced by a belvedere complete with renaissance-type balustrading typical of the homes of English ship captains. It was burned down in World War II to prevent the Japanese from using it. It was opened to the public by descendants of the original owner and is listed as among the World's 12 most fascinating ruins.

Paglaum Sports Complex

The Paglaum Sports Complex is a provincial-owned sports venue adjacent to the Negros Occidental High School established during the 1970s that hosted various football events, such as the 1991 Philippines International Cup and the football event of the 2005 Southeast Asian Games. It also hosted three editions of the Palarong Pambansa (1971, 1974, 1979). However, the stadium became unfit to host football matches following the erection of business establishments around the area. In 2012, a two-hectare portion of the four-hectare complex was partitioned for the construction of the Capitol-owned Negros First CyberCentre (NFCC) as an IT-BPO Outsourcing Hub. As of 2013, the provincial government has been proposing for a renovation of the stadium to serve as alternative venue to Panaad Park and Sports Complex, particularly for football competition. Recently, the Paglaum Sports Complex also serves as an alternative venue to the Bacolod Public Plaza for the MassKara Festival celebration.

Negros Occidental Multi-Purpose Activity Center

The Negros Occidental Multi-Purpose Activity Center (NOMPAC) is a provincial-owned multi-use gym located in Bacolod, adjacent to the Capitol Park and Lagoon. It is currently used mostly for basketball, karatedo and boxing matches. Aside from the gym, it also serves as evacuation site of the city and province during disasters and likewise also serves as cultural facilities in many events and celebrations.

Education

There are 1,318 schools in the province; 53 are registered technical schools including the Technological University of the Philippines – Visayas and Carlos Hilado Memorial State University both in Talisay City. Of these, 158 are private schools, including University of Saint La Salle, STI West Negros University, Colegio San Agustin - Bacolod, La Consolacion College Bacolod, VMA Global College, University of Negros Occidental - Recoletos, Central Philippines State University, Philippine Normal University Visayas, Southland College and Central Philippine Adventist College.

Universities and colleges

 ABE International Business College – Bacolod Campus
 AMA Computer College – Bacolod Campus
 Aeronavigation Academy International Philippines, Inc.
 Asian College of Aeronautics – Main Campus (Bacolod)
 Bacolod Christian College of Negros
 Bacolod City College
 Bago City College
 Binalbagan Catholic College
 Cabarrus Catholic College
 Carlos Hilado Memorial State University – Main Campus, Talisay City
 Carlos Hilado Memorial State University – Alijis Campus, Bacolod
 Carlos Hilado Memorial State University – Fortune Towne Campus, Bacolod
 Carlos Hilado Memorial State University – College of Fisheries, Binalbagan
 Central Negros College
 Central Philippine Adventist College
 Central Philippines State University – Main Campus (Kabankalan)
 Candoni Campus
 Cauayan Campus
 Sipalay Campus
 Hinigaran Campus
 San Carlos Campus
 Victorias Campus
 Ilog Campus
 Hinoba-an Campus
 Moises Padilla Campus
 Colegio de Santa Ana de Victorias
 Colegio de Santa Rita de San Carlos, Inc.
 Colegio de Santo Tomas – Recoletos
 Colegio San Agustin – Bacolod
 College of Arts & Sciences of Asia & the Pacific – Bacolod Campus
 Convention Baptist Bible College
 FAST Aviation Academy, Inc. – Bacolod
 Fellowship Baptist College
 Fortress College
 John B. Lacson Colleges Foundation – Bacolod
 Kabankalan Catholic College
 La Carlota City College
 La Consolacion College Bacolod
La Consolacion College Isabela
La Consolacion College Murcia
 LaSalTech, Inc.
 LaSalTech - Bacolod
 LaSalTech - Cadiz
 LaSalTech - Kabankalan
 LaSalTech - La Carlota
 Mapúa Malayan Digital College – Learning Hub Bacolod
 Mount Carmel College of Escalante, Inc.
 Negros Occidental Language and Information Technology Center (NOLITC) 
 Northern Negros State College of Science and Technology – Main Campus (Sagay City)
 Northern Negros State College of Science and Technology – School of Nursing Campus (Cadiz)
 Northern Negros State College of Science and Technology – Calatrava Campus
 Northern Negros State College of Science and Technology – Escalante Campus
 Our Lady of Mercy College – Bacolod
 Philippine Normal University Visayas (Cadiz)
 Riverside College, Inc.
 Sacred Heart Seminary and Shrine - Bacolod
 St. Scholastica's Academy - Bacolod
 STI West Negros University
 Southland College
 Tañon College
 Technological University of the Philippines Visayas, Talisay City Campus
 Technological University of the Philippines Visayas, Sagay City Extension Campus
 Technological University of the Philippines Visayas, Cadiz Extension Campus
 University of Saint La Salle
 University of Negros Occidental – Recoletos
 VMA Global College
 West Visayas State University – Himamaylan City Campus

Media

Modern communication facilities, as well as radio, television and newspapers, are available in the province. Most are provided by dominant national players in the industry like PLDT, Globe Telecom and their subsidiaries. For television and radio, the major providers are network giants ABS-CBN, GMA Network, The 5 Network, CNN Philippines and IBC. Cable TV provides access to BBC, ESPN and other international programs. National and international newspapers are available on the same day of issue in Manila.

Bacolod is noted for being the home of the Negros Summer Workshops, founded by multi-award-winning filmmaker and Negrense Peque Gallaga. Founded in 1991, Workshops has long been training students from different parts of the country who wish to learn courses in film-making, acting, writing, and more. Some of its alumni include actors in mainstream Philippine show business.

Negros Occidental has also been used as a setting and location shoot for various films and television shows, most notable of which is the 1981 epic Oro, Plata, Mata where Hacienda Rosalia is the setting. Recent films that were set and filmed in Negros are Ligaw Liham (2007), Namets! (2008), and Everyday I Love You (2015).

There are two regional newscast programs in Bacolod: TV Patrol Negros (ABS-CBN Bacolod) and One Western Visayas (GMA Bacolod, simulcasting from GMA Iloilo).

Notable personalities

See also
 Capitol Park and Lagoon
 Diocese of Bacolod
 Diocese of Kabankalan
 Diocese of San Carlos (Philippines)
 Northern Negros Natural Park

References

External links

 
 
 
 Official Website of the Provincial Government of Negros Occidental
 Local Governance Performance Management System
 ExperienceNegros Travel & Lifestyle

 
Provinces of the Philippines
Provinces of Western Visayas
States and territories established in 1890
1890 establishments in the Philippines